Paying the Piper is a 1949 Warner Bros. Looney Tunes cartoon directed by Robert McKimson. The short was released on March 12, 1949, and stars Porky Pig.

It is a parody of the fairy tale The Pied Piper and it involves Porky trying to stop a cat that disguises himself as the last rat to bring the rats back for the local cats, and later, to get the reward money back from the cat, by playing a clarinet. It has Porky in the role of the piper character.

Plot
The people of the town of Hamelin are celebrating the high rat population being driven from the town. The cats hearing the news understand that they do not bode well for them as it means their main food source is gone. In panic, they decide to go to the Supreme Cat for a solution to the problem. Supreme tells to the crowd of cats that his plan is to get the rats back by sabotaging the Piper's reward collecting with a rat suit.

While wearing the rat suit, Supreme sneaks into the town hall. Supreme arrives at the town hall as Porky is going to get his reward money from the mayor. Supreme walks straight into the mayor's office and does a Last of the Mohicans impression and the mayor tells Porky he won't be getting the money until that rat is gone.

Around the town, Supreme bothers Porky by running around in the rat costume and momentarily removes it to trip and insult Porky in various ways. Porky eventually grabs the rat suit and Supreme deliberately loses it. Porky takes the empty costume back to the town hall to get the reward money. Just when the mayor gets the reward money from the vault, Supreme pops out and steals it. Porky chases after him to get it back, which he does by tricking the cat to come out of hiding by pretending to bring the rats back. Finally Porky gets the reward money and insults the cat back before he leaves playing his clarinet and walks into the distance.

References

External links

1949 animated films
1949 short films
Looney Tunes shorts
Warner Bros. Cartoons animated short films
Films directed by Robert McKimson
Films based on Pied Piper of Hamelin
Porky Pig films
1949 films
Animated films about cats
Films about pigs
Films scored by Carl Stalling
1940s Warner Bros. animated short films
1940s English-language films